Jasmine Lee may refer to:

 Jasmine Bacurnay Lee, Filipino-Korean actress and civil servant
 Jasmine Lee, the fictional grandmother of Juniper Lee